The girls' football tournament at the 2014 Summer Youth Olympics took place at the Wutaishan Stadium and the Jiangning Sports Center, both located in Nanjing, China, between 14–26 August 2014.

Each match lasted 80 minutes, consisting of two periods of 40 minutes, with an interval of 15 minutes.

Participating teams
One team from each continental confederation participated in the tournament. The same country may not participate in both the boys' and girls' tournament. As hosts, China was given Asia's spot to compete in the girls' tournament (and thus could not participate in the boys' tournament). Teams may qualify through preliminary competitions, or be nominated for participation by their confederation, with the invited teams ratified by FIFA during their meeting in Zürich on 3–4 October 2013.

Squads

Players must be 15 years old (born between 1 January and 31 December 1999) to be eligible to participate. Each team consisted of 18 players (two of whom must be goalkeepers).

Match officials
A total of six referees and twelve assistant referees were appointed by FIFA for the tournament.

† Morag Pirie is affiliated with the Football Association of Scotland. Since Scotland is not a member of the IOC, she is listed by the IOC under Great Britain.

Group stage
The draw was held at the Hilton Hotel in Nanjing on 14 May 2014. The winners and runners-up of each group advance to the semi-finals. The rankings of teams in each group are determined as follows:
 points obtained in all group matches;
 goal difference in all group matches;
 number of goals scored in all group matches;
If two or more teams are equal on the basis of the above three criteria, their rankings are determined as follows:
 points obtained in the group matches between the teams concerned;
 goal difference in the group matches between the teams concerned;
 number of goals scored in the group matches between the teams concerned;
 drawing of lots by the FIFA Organising Committee.

All times are local: Nanjing in China Standard Time (UTC+8)

Group A

Group B

Knockout stage
In the knockout stages, if a match is level at the end of normal playing time, the match is determined by a penalty shoot-out (no extra time is played).

Semi-finals

Fifth place match

Bronze medal match

Gold medal match

Final ranking

Goalscorers
7 goals
 Deyna Castellanos

5 goals
 Ma Xiaolan

4 goals
 Martina Šurnovská

3 goals

 Zhang Jiayun
 Daniela Garcia
 Montserrat Hernandez
 Alejandra Zaragoza
 Nathalie Pasquel

2 goals

 Jin Kun
 Wan Wenting
 Dayana Cázares
 Bellinda Giada

1 goal

 Fang Jie
 Wang Yanwen
 Wu Xi
 Xie Qiwen
 Zhao Yujie
 Maria Acedo
 Ignacia Haoses
 Ivone Kooper
 Marity Sep
 Veronika Jančová
 Laura Suchá
 Argelis Campos
 Greisbell Marquez
 Yuleisi Rivero
 Hilary Vergara

1 own goal

 Diana Anguiano (playing against Slovakia)
 Andrea Herbríková (playing against Mexico)

References

External links
Event – Overview – Women, Nanjing 2014
Girls' Youth Olympic Football Tournament Nanjing 2014 , FIFA.com
FIFA Technical Report

Football at the 2014 Summer Youth Olympics
2014 in women's association football